Kjeld Nuis (born in Leiden 10 November 1989) is a Dutch speed skater.

Nuis specializes over the middle distances of 1000 and 1500 meters. At the 2018 Winter Olympics in Pyeongchang, he won the gold medal at the 1500 m and 1000 m events. At the 2022 Winter Olympics, he successfully defended his title on the 1500 m. He is the current holder of the world record over 1500 meters.

Career
Nuis is a three-time Olympic champion, having won Olympic gold in both the 1000 and 1500 meters at the 2018 Winter Olympics. He won another gold in the 1500 meters four years later, improving Derek Parra's twenty-year-old Olympic Record to 1:43:21 in the process. He is also a two-time world single-distance champion over 1000 and 1500 meters. 
He is a multi-time world single distance medalist over 1000 and 1500 meters, a four-time season overall World Cup winner of the 1000 meters distance, and a two-time winner over 1500 meters.

On 10 March 2019, he set the world record for the 1500 meter event to 1:40:17 in the Utah Olympic Oval during the finals of the 2018-19 World Cup tour. A day earlier, in the same event, he also improved the 1000 meters world record to 1:06:18, which stood until bested by Pavel Kulizhnikov on 15 February 2020.

In Savalen, Norway on 17 March 2022, he set a new world speed skating record of 103 kilometers per hour.

Personal life
From 2014 until the end of 2018, Nuis was in a relationship with  2011 Jill Lauren de Robles. They have a son.

On 19 December 2018, Nuis was named Dutch Sportsman of the Year 2018 at the NOC NSF Sport Gala.

He lives in Emmen.

Records

Personal records

World records established

Tournament overview

Source:

World Cup overview

Source:
– = Did not participate
(b) = Division B
DQ = Disqualified
NC = No classification

Medals won

References

External links
 
 

1989 births
Dutch male speed skaters
Sportspeople from Leiden
Living people
Speed skaters at the 2018 Winter Olympics
Speed skaters at the 2022 Winter Olympics
Olympic speed skaters of the Netherlands
Medalists at the 2018 Winter Olympics
Medalists at the 2022 Winter Olympics
Olympic medalists in speed skating
Olympic gold medalists for the Netherlands
World Single Distances Speed Skating Championships medalists
World Sprint Speed Skating Championships medalists
20th-century Dutch people
21st-century Dutch people